Bang Khen is one of the 50 districts (khet) of Bangkok, Thailand. It is bounded by other Bangkok districts (from north clockwise): Sai Mai, Khlong Sam Wa, Khan Na Yao, Bueng Kum, Lat Phrao, Chatuchak, Lak Si, and Don Mueang.

History
Bang Khen was established as an amphoe (district) of Phra Nakhon province in 1897. The district occupied a vast plain called Thung Bang Khen (ทุ่งบางเขน; 'Bang Khen Field') in north Bangkok. Farms dominated its landscape. In October 1933, the district was a battleground in the "Boworadet rebellion" contested by the army of Prince Boworadet and government troop.

Its name "Bang Khen" is said to be distorted from the word Bang Ken (บางเข็น; 'Place of Push'). It originated from a folk tale titled "Legend of Lord Uthong" (ตำนานท้าวอู่ทอง) when a gold tanker of Lord Uthong (not King Uthong of Ayutthaya) ran aground in a local canal. Therefore, having to push [ken in Thai] a tanker to pass through with tangle.

In 1972, Thonburi and Phra Nakhon Provinces were combined and called Krung Thep Maha Nakhon. Administrative units within the capital were renamed "districts" (khet) and "sub-district" (khwaeng), replacing "amphoe" and "tambon" respectively. Bang Khen became a district in the newly combined province. At that time it had eight sub-districts.

Bang Khen was once a very large district, but has been reduced in size after several modifications to district boundaries. In 1989, western and southwestern portions were split off to create Don Mueang district and Chatuchak district respectively. In 1997, a northern portion of Bang Khen was split off to create Sai Mai district, but in the same reorganization Bang Khen received Moo 8-10 of Chorakhe Bua Sub-district from Lat Phrao district.

 the Thai Army's 11th Infantry Division occupies  of land in Bang Khen.

Governance
The district is divided into two sub-districts (khwaeng): Anusawari (อนุสาวรีย์) and Tha Raeng (ท่าแร้ง).

District council
The Bang Khen district council has eight members, who serve four-year terms. Elections were last held on 30 April 2006. The Thai Rak Thai Party won all eight seats.

Places of interest
 Wat Phra Si Mahathat Wora Maha Wiharn (วัดพระศรีมหาธาตุวรมหาวิหาร) Temple of Holy Relics
 Constitution Defense Monument (อนุสาวรีย์พิทักษ์รัฐธรรมนูญ) at Lak Si Circle (วงเวียนหลักสี่)
 Sathira Dhammasathan (เสถียรธรรมสถาน) Buddhist Retreat Center
 Ying Charoen Market (ตลาดยิ่งเจริญ) or Saphan Mai Market (ตลาดสะพานใหม่). The original name of Saphan Mai was Saphan Sukoranakhaseni (สะพานสุกรนาคเสนีย์)
Lumphini Boxing Stadium (สนามมวยเวทีลุมพินี) Muay Thai arena moved from Pathum Wan in 2014

Education
 Phranakhon Rajabhat University, (Khwaeng Anusawari)
 Rattanakosin Somphot Bangkhen School, (Khwaeng Tha Raeng)
 Bang Khen District non-formal and informal Education, (Khwaeng Anusawari)
Krirk University

References

External links
 BMA website with the tourist landmarks of Bang Khen
 Bang Khen district office (Thai only)
 Map of Bang Khen District

 
Districts of Bangkok